John William McCormack (August 15, 1925 – November 11, 1987) was an American diver. He competed in the men's 10 metre platform event at the 1952 Summer Olympics.

References

External links
 
 

1925 births
1987 deaths
American male divers
Olympic divers of the United States
Divers at the 1952 Summer Olympics
Sportspeople from San Francisco